A memory war is a political dispute over the interpretation or memorialization of a historical event. It is applied especially to disputes in Central and Eastern Europe over the interpretation of World War II.

Reference

Aftermath of war